The 2009–10 Texas Longhorns women's basketball team represented University of Texas at Austin in the 2009–10 NCAA Division I basketball season. The Longhorns were coached by Gail Goestenkors. The Longhorns are a member of the Big 12 Conference.

Offseason
May 4: The Texas Women's Basketball team joins an elite field selected to participate in The U.S. Virgin Islands Paradise Jam tournament in November at the University of the Virgin Islands in St. Thomas, USVI.

Exhibition

Paradise Jam
 Games at the 2009 US Virgin Islands Paradise Jam shall be played at the U.V.I. Sports and Fitness Center, a basketball facility located in Charlotte Amalie, St. Thomas.

Regular season
Dec 1: Erika Arriaran made seven 3-pointers and scored a career-high 23 points in a 94–80 victory over Oral Roberts. Arriaran set a career best for three-pointers and grabbed four rebounds.
The Longhorns will compete in the University of Miami tournament to be held from December 28 to 29.

Roster

Schedule
The Longhorns will compete in the University of Miami Tournament, to be held on December 28 and 29.

Big 12 Championship

Player stats

Postseason

NCAA basketball tournament

Awards and honors

Team players drafted into the WNBA

References

External links
Official Site

Texas Longhorns women's basketball seasons
Texas
Texas